The 2016 Pan Am Team Badminton Championships is a continental championships tournament of badminton teams in Pan America. The event was held in Guadalajara, Mexico from 17 to 20 February 2016.

Tournament
The 2016 Pan Am Team Badminton Championships, officially Pan Am Team Continental Championships 2016, is a continental stage tournament of Thomas and Uber Cups, and also to crown the best men's and women's badminton team in Pan America. This event organized by the Badminton Pan Am and Mexican Association of Badminton. 8 teams, consisting of 4 men's teams and 4 women's teams entered the tournament.

Medalists

Medal table

Men's team

First round

Guatemala vs. Mexico

Canada vs. United States

Canada vs. Guatemala

Mexico vs. United States

Canada vs. Mexico

Guatemala vs. United States

Final
Mexico vs. Canada

Women's team

First round

Guatemala vs. Mexico

Canada vs. United States

Canada vs. Guatemala

Mexico vs. United States

Canada vs. Mexico

Guatemala vs. United States

Final
United States vs. Canada

References

External links
 Tournament Link

Pan Am Badminton Championships
Pan Am Team Badminton Championships
Badminton in Mexico
International sports competitions hosted by Mexico